Tacoma Park is an unincorporated community in Brown County, in the U.S. state of South Dakota.

History
1914–1951. Tacoma Park derives its name from Tacoma, Washington, and on account of the wooded town site.

References

Unincorporated communities in Brown County, South Dakota
Unincorporated communities in South Dakota